Rother may refer to:

General
Rother (surname) (also sometimes spelled Röther)
Rother District, a local government district in East Sussex, England
Rother FM, an independent local radio station for Rotherham, South Yorkshire, England
Rother Kuppe, a mountain in Bavaria, Germany
Rother Ochsen, a tavern in Stein am Rhein, Switzerland
HMS Rother, two Royal Navy warships
SS Rother (1914), a ship

Rivers
River Rother, East Sussex, in East Sussex and Kent
River Rother, West Sussex, in Hampshire and West Sussex
River Rother, South Yorkshire

See also 
Rother Valley (disambiguation)